Fairlie was launched at Calcutta in 1810 and sailed to England. There she became a regular ship for the British East India Company (EIC). Including her voyage to England, she made four voyages for the EIC. From around 1821 on she became a Free Trader, continuing to trade with India under a license from the EIC. She also made two voyages transporting convicts to New South Wales (1834), and Tasmania (1852). She made several voyages carrying immigrants to South Australia, New South Wales, and British Guiana. She foundered in November 1865.

EIC voyages

Fairlie cost 130,000 rupees to build.

EIC voyage #1 (1810): Captain William Parker D'Esterre sailed from Saugor on 19 July 1810, bound for England. She reached Madras on 30 August and St Helena on 3 December, and arrived at The Downs on 26 February 1811.

Fairlie, Fairlie, Fergusson, & Co., owners, appeared in a list of vessels registered in Calcutta in January 1811.

EIC voyage #2 (1812–1814): Captain D'Esteree acquired a letter of marque on 30 November 1811. He sailed from Portsmouth on 3 June 1812, bound for Batavia, Madras, and Bengal. Fairlie reached Madeira on 18 June and arrived at Saugor on 5 December. She then sailed on to Penang (28 March 1813) and Malacca (7 April).

This shoal became known as "Fairlie Rock", or more currently "Fairlie Klip" or "Fairlie Rif". Apparently Fairlie got off the shoal without material damage.

On 1 May, Fairlie reached Batavia. She sailed to Samarang, which she reached on 26 May, before returning to Batavia on 18 June.

By 18 July, Fairlie was again at Madras, and by 17 August Kidderpore. Homeward bound, she was at Saugor on 2 November, the Cape of Good Hope on 1 March 1814, and St Helena on 18 March.

Fairlie arrived at Blackwall on 3 June.

EIC voyage #3 (1815–1816): Captain Thomas E. Ward sailed from The Downs on 22 May 1815, bound for Bengal and Batavia. On 10 June Fairlie reached Madeira.

Mount Tambora exploded in April 1815. Fairlie arrived at the New Anchorage (near Diamond Harbour and Kedgeree) on 31 October. Homeward  bound, Fairlie was at Batavia on 20 April, reached St Helena on 21 August, and arrived at Blackwall on 8 November.

EIC voyage #4 (1818–1819): Captain Ward sailed from The Downs on 1 April 1818, bound for Bengal and Bombay. Fairlie reached Diamond Harbour on 7 August. Homeward bound, she was at the New Anchorage on 3 October, and Bombay on 8 December. She was at Tellichery on 2 January 1819, reached St Helena on 26 March, and arrived at Blackwall on 8 June.

Free trader
In 1813, the EIC lost its monopoly on the trade between Britain and India; it retained its monopoly on the trade between Britain and China. Many vessels then entered the trade with India, becoming Free Traders sailing under licenses from the EIC. Fairlies owners gave up their status as an EIC regular ship and converted to Free Trader status.

Fairlie continue to trade between Britain and India, and later South America, but also began transporting convicts and carrying migrants.

Nassau had wrecked on the island of Tristan da Cunha on 31 August.

First convict voyage (1833–1834): Captain Henry Ager sailed from England on 27 October 1833 and arrived at Sydney on 15 February 1834. Fairlie had embarked 374 male convicts and she landed 372, having suffered four convict deaths en route.

Immigrants to South Australia (1840): Captain Edward Garrett sailed Fairlie from London on 3 April 1840 with cargo and 266 passengers. She arrived at Port Adelaide on 6 July.

Immigrants to New South Wales (1841): Fairlie arrived on 5 November 1841 at Sydney. She had left Cork, with 308 bounty immigrants, and a number of cabin and intermediate passengers. She had suffered six deaths on board, four of them children under the age of five.

In 1843, Fairlie was sold to Joseph Somes, London.

Second convict voyage (1852): Captain Edward Pavey sailed from Plymouth on 11 March 1852 and arrived at Hobart on 3 July. She had embarked 294 male convicts and she landed 292, having suffered two convict deaths en route.

Immigrants to British Guiana (1860–1861): Fairlie sailed from India on 12 December 1860 with 367 immigrants for British Guiana.

Fate
In 1865, the Merchant Shipping Co., Ltd., London, became Fairlies owner. Lloyd's Register for 1866 shows Fairlie with Stephens, master, Merchant, owner, and trade London–Australia. The entry for her is market "LOST".

The Times reported that on 6 January 1866 Innisfallen had delivered the crew of Fairlie to Mauritius. Innisfallen had been on her way from Calcutta to London when she rescued the survivors.

Notes

Citations

References
 
 
 
 
 

1810 ships
British ships built in India
Age of Sail merchant ships of England
Ships of the British East India Company
Convict ships to New South Wales
Convict ships to Tasmania
Migrant ships to Australia
Maritime incidents in November 1865